Pell City School District is a school district in St. Clair County, Alabama.

As of 2023, Dr. James Martin is the superintendent of the Pell City School District.

References

External links
 

Education in St. Clair County, Alabama
School districts in Alabama